Bengaluru Ganesh Utsava, It all started with the enthusiasm of a handful of youths. They were searching for a forum to involve themselves and share their thoughts and enthusiasm. Urge of the youth mooted Shri Vidyaranya Vichara Vinimaya Kannadigara Sangha, later transformed as Shri Vidyaranya Yuvaka Sangha. Ever since, celebration of Ganesha Utsava was one of the important activities of the Sangha, which is successfully completing fifty years and pioneers Ganesha festival celebration in the garden city, Bengaluru. You will find the sections on art, dance, music, culture and its uncompromising efforts to restore the heritage, and a well-planned transition, passing it over to next generation without disquieting its unique aesthetical beauty. Pages of this fifty years saga, also  narrates various efforts started by the Sangha: rehabilitating the victims of natural calamities; how a society can gain its identity through cultural activities; how a forum can be a role model through its self-imposed disciplined inventiveness and most importantly projecting genuine literary, cultural and social talents of this country by organizing festivals. Today the fragrance of this festival has spread across not only the garden city but across the nation.  

Musicians, theatre groups and ballet troupes are invited to stage programs.

Melody makers of Kannada in Cycle mart 

It was the beginning of 1960s. It was the time of awakening of the Kannada movement. Shri Ku Ra See, Shri Aa Na Kru, Shri. Ma Ramamurthy were some of the personalities trying to wake-up Kannadiga's self-esteem. It was the time of emergence of Kannada Sanghas lead by valiant men. Windblown of Kannada touched even the people at Vinayaka cycle mart, located on DVG Road, Basavanagudi. It was a group of youths, who were interested in creating a mark in the society. Shri G K Gopal, who was owner of the cycle mart, his brother G K Obhaiah, friends  A Mariyappa, Gangadhar (who went on to become a famous artist in sandalwood), Shri Shivashankar, Shri Sundar and others. Their discussion points were always Literature, Kannada language, culture and nurturing them by their efforts. Finally, putting words into action, this group of youth mooted Shri Vidyaranya Vichara Vinimaya Kannadigara Sangha.

This young brigade was filled with ideas, hearts with passion for Kannada language and bicycles to ride! Money was the thing, most wanted! Play writer Basher came into rescue. By no time his script Ranakahale drama was ready for the stage! All group members had a role to act! Beneficiary show went off well in town-hall. After all accounts were settled they had a profit of Rs. 300. With this little money the youths decided to start Shri Vidyaranya Yuvaka Sangha, and Shri Ku Ra See (who has penned one of the most beautiful eight minutes film song for Dashavatara, which narrates glorious lord Rama's incarnation) was asked to preside the sangha. Since then, the activities and vision of the sangha marked the beginning of the journey.

1962: Launch of first Ganesha Utsava 
The very first Ganesha festival was inaugurated on 2 September 1962 by the then home minister Shri R M Patil at the D V G road Mallikarjuna temple lane. Veteran vocal singers Shri P Kalinga Rao, Bengaluru Latha, Shri Gururajuludas of Mandya entertained the audience by their fine performance. The function conducted on the streets was witnessed by famous personalities like D V G himself.

Even during the later years, veterans such as Shri T R Shamanna, Shri V S Krishna Iyar, Shri Jwalamukhi Satya supported the Sangha's activities with open arms. During 1960s and the 70s sangha was led by Shri Paramashivanna and Shri Mohan Shet as presidents.

PBS & SPB's concerts gave new dimension to the Utsava 
Almost into a decade, local musicians, dancers, folk-artists, and epic narrators entertained the audiences at the Ganesha festival. These are the artists who laid the foundation of music art and culture which popularized the Utsava.

It was in 1974: South Indian singing legend Dr. P B Srinivas and iconic music director M Ranga Rao enthralled the audience with their performance at the Utsava. Next year S P Balasubramanyam followed the musical wave. Audiences were thrilled as it was SPB's first live musical performance in Karnataka. Concerts of PBS and SPB were music from heaven for the packed audiences.

Programs performed by celebrated divas, celestial musicians, pleasant and marvelous weather of the Garden City and of all gracious and orderly arrangements attracted innumerable audiences from all corners of the city. Spacious cultural pathway of Basavanagudi, DVG road used to be cramped with people during the festival! Only way out to avoid traffic jams was to shift the venue of the Utsava. It happened so in 1976. The festival place was shifted to near by Mallikarjuna temple premises.

During the same period, there was a fire incident. While Gururajuludas of Mandya was performing, the main stage where the idol of Ganesha was installed and finely decorated with cotton to create an impression of Himalaya caught fire. Within seconds the pandal was filled by smoke and fire. In a tensed situation Ganesha's idol was disfigured. Programs were canceled. Talk of bad omen spread among folks. Some suggested it was better to stop the Ganesha festival. However, members of the Sangha were together, unperturbed and very firm on continuing the Ganesha Utsava as usual. “We have gone through number of such hurdles, which have made us stronger and that is the precise reason why we could complete fifty years of the Utsava”, says founder member Shri A Mariyappa.

Along with the Ganesha Utsava, the Sangha gradually involved itself in other social activities. Cyclone in Andhra Pradesh during 1978 provided an opportunity for the sangha to contribute to a social cause. It organized a musical evening at the Kanteerava stadium by S P Balasubramannayam.  He was accompanied by Dr. P B Srinivas, S Janaki, Vani Jayaram and S P Shailaja. Matinee idols like Dr. Vishnuvardhan, Rebel Star Ambarish, Bharati Vishuvardhan, Style King Rajanikant, Kamal Hassan, music directors Rajan-Nagendra, Vijayabhaskar and others attend this event and contributed to the noble cause. The event not only brought Kannadigas together but also changed the perspective of the Sangha forever. The money mobilized on the occasion was distributed to flood victims through Shri Ramakrishna mission. We can see the houses built by this money even today in Nellore district of Andhra Pradesh with sangha's name etched on it.

Kannada Rajyotsava Celebrations 
Seer of Hampi Shri Veerupaksha Vidyaranya Maha Samsthana, Shri Narasimha Bharati Swamy got to know of the sangha activities and contacted the Sangha's members. Moved by the good deeds and work of Sangha, the seer encouraged the members to celebrate Karnataka Rajyotsava. Same year the Sangha installed the idol of Bhuvaneshwari and celebrated Rajyotsava.

Other activities 
Alongside, Sangha got involved itself in conducting Cricket matches, Volley ball tournaments and other sports events, which gained popularity among youths. Supporting poor students through various means the sangha has helped them perceive education. Financial support to conduct marriages for economically weaker parents, organizing health camps, felicitating people who have contributed in the field of social work are other activities of the sangha.

Shri R Paramashivanna, M Mohan Sheth, K K Vishwanath, A Mariyappa, G O Krishna, V Subramanyam have served as presidents of the sangha; G K Obaiah, V Mutthu, Shivashankar, Mukund Rao, Rangaraju, Ramesh, Shridhar, N Uday, N Satyanarayanaiah, Hirannaiah, P M Raghavendra. R S Rajanna, Gowdegowda (LIC), Chadrashekar, Papanna, Eshwar, Girish Sa, Ramachandra, Krishnamurthy served as office bearers. Shri T S Veerabhadraiah, Somashekar, G K Gopal, K G Devendra Swamy, Reddeppa, film artist Gangadhar, former Mayor T D Naganna Bhairappa, Gaer Seena and others served as patrons and supported the sangha during the early decades.. Shri H K Muralidhar, Mohan (PWD), Amba, Ravishankar, Venkatesh, Meda Ramesh, Rajesh Reddy, Harsha, Nagesh, Ramulu, Umesh, Appu, Mukhi, Narayan, Rajendra, Hariprasad, Murugan, Bhushan, Basavaraj, Navin, Raji, Gopal, James, Manju, Papu, Harish, Nitin, Arjun Gowda, Deshraj Rai, MTR Suresh and many more people have shared their vision and time to strengthen the Sangha in every respect. In the fifty years of its journey, sangha's activities has been supported and nurtured by each and every member, with age being no bar.

Rise of youth power 
Founders of the Sangha at some point thought of transferring the reigns from the old brigade to the younger generation. As few youths from the family of   founding members and there friends were active in the sangha since 1998.  In 2003 the responsibility was handed over to the younger generation. Led by A Mariyappa's son S M Nandish transfer of responsibility went off very smoothly. Obalesh and Chandrashekar, sons of G K Gopal, Nataraj s/o Veerabhadraiah, Vasanth s/o Satyanarayana, Krishna s/o G K Obaiah, Subramanyam s/o V Muthu were the young brigade delegated to take forward the activities of the sangha. These young enthusiasts' changed the sangha by infusing new blood.

S M Nandish and his team brought in professionalism and brand equity to the Utsava. Team mobilized youths, acknowledged elders advice, reciprocated to contemporary issues and concerns. “These things lead us to success” says S M Nandish. With its ever growing popularity, increase in audience numbers, venue of the Utsava was shifted again in 2007 to A P S college grounds.

A new brand called B G U 

Since 2008 the Ganesha festival was rebranded as Bengaluru Ganesha Utsava or B G U!  This branding was brought to life by the new young brigades who were at the helm now.  The young wanted to bring in a different flavor to the festival, which was a natural transition.  This catapulted BGUs status as a festival reflecting the rich culture of this city.  The newness was not just in the name but also reflected in every activity.

The youth element was at the forefront. Popular celebrities were invited who would appeal to all ages. But, Indian culture, heritage, history was kept intact. Traditional tastes were blended with new savor. Classical music, traditional dance forms, popular playback singers, film artists – the programs attracted every section of the society.  With this changed BGU which has moved into the 50th year was undoubtedly an effort the young brought in. The crowds started pouring in; all the 11 days the grounds were packed with people jostling to catch a glimpse of the celebrities perform. The fervor last year took the festival to an even larger venue, the National College grounds in Basavanagudi.  With every growing year, the responsibilities also increased.  The committed young team of the Sangha managed all the events successfully.

The new approach gave birth to the women's wing of the organization. Since 2008, they started playing a key role in organizing the Utsava.  Their contribution in every aspect of the festival including collecting donations is commendable. Yearlong preparation A yearlong planning and preparation by the complete team is what it takes to put the Utsava together.

Calendar of events of the Sangha 

T V Nataraj's office is Sangha's registered office.  There are at least six meetings conducted in a year. First meeting happens on the first Sunday of the year in the month of January.  In the meeting, list of probable artists will be prepared, teams are formulated to take-up different tasks & other aspects of the Utsava are discussed.  Sponsorship, Tieups, Advertisements, Call center, PR, IT, Accounts, Govt Laisoning, Disciplinary, Incentive, Collection, Electrical, Water, Toilers, Provision Collection, Stalls, Publicity, Infrastructure, Banners, Prasada, Passes, Merchandise sales, Arathi, Hundi, Atist & Stage management, Seating, Reception, Cleaning, Memento, Seva follow up, Pooja, Stores, Security & Procession Committee are the various teams formed.  Leaders for each team will be announced. After a month or two, members again meet to draw a frame-work of the events.

During June–July, three months before the Ganesha festival, team members initiate fund raising by going door to door to all the business establishments, residences & offices. Along-side festival preparations begin.

Eleven days of Utsava, no matter whether member is young or old, everyone will be ready in the Sangha's uniform and badge symbolizing the spirit of the festival. Each member is governed by the rules of the Sangha.

Local folk artist teams gain priority on the eleventh day: the day of Ganesha's idol dissolution. Important traditional forms of folk music are performed on that day. Streets are illuminated with colorful lights which creates heavenly atmosphere. To avoid water pollution, in 2011 Ganesha's idol was dissolved in a tipper tanker. Banning the use of plastic as a decision has also emerged out of environment concern. All devotees enroute the procession are served prasadam.

A month after Ganesha festival, the sangha celebrates Vidyaranya Habba, where joy of successful completion of Ganesha festival is celebrated. Best performing teams and members who are part of the success are felicitated. Opportunity for the team members to exhibit their talent is also part of the Habba. The best performer of the year receives a star performer award.

Before the dust settles on the previous year's success, comes January and preparation for the next Ganesha festival begins!

All expenses of Vidyaranya Habba and meetings of the Sangha are borne by its members. Public money is used only to conduct the Ganesha festival.

Preference to Pooja and Prasadam 

During the festival of Ganesha, all Poojas for Vighnavinashaka Ganesha are performed with devotion and dedication. Every morning and evening, Panchamruta Abhisheka and Aarati for Ganesha is performed. Pushpaalankara Seve with the offerings of colorful flowers to the Lord, Modakahara Seve, and Kadubinahara Seve go hand in hand with Abhisheka and Aarati. Ganapati Homa to Lord Ganesha is performed daily with diligence. On a Monday, devotees perform Ekadasha Rudrabhisheka and Girija Kalyana. Tuesday will have Ga-Kara Ganapathi Pooja, worshipping of Ganesha with Garike by the devotees themselves. Sumangaliyaru perform Kumkuma-archane to the Goddess on Friday. During one of the auspicious days of the festival's eleven days, Sri Ganapati, Navagraha, Mrutyunjaya, and Durga Homa are performed, with devotees participating in large numbers. Amongst the glowing series of lamps in the Mantapa, Rangapooje is performed daily. Devotees find themselves mesmerized, with all the flowers, fruits, beetal leaves, coconuts and pancha-kajjaya.  Aarati-Devotional songs for Ganesha by over a hundred singers and percussion instruments adds to the festivities. Every evening, Pallaki Utsava takes place, a gala celebration, involving a large number of devotees, with chatra chamara, several Panju, and accompaniments. This provides the onlookers with a divine experience as well as brings sparkle to the festival. Every day, ladies sing devotional songs in praise of the Lord. Many saints and religious leaders have graced the Ganesha festival.

Yet another part of the Utsava is the Nitya Prasada Vitarane and Sri Satyanarayana Pooje.  A lot of preparation goes into these two being performed. Every day, different Prasada are tastefully prepared and distributed. No devotee coming to the festival will go without obtaining the Prasada. For this purpose, Prasada counters are kept open always at the three doors of the Pandal. Similarly, Sri Satyanarayana Pooja is followed by Sarvajanika Anna Dasoha.

Aromas of Karnataka, The Food Utsav 
Karnataka is a land of geographical diversity, home of cultural splendor; so is the culinary heritage of the land.  'Aromas of Karnataka' is to provide healthy desi flavored food to the people participating long hours at the festival. 46th Utsava onwards, the program is tastefully bringing the local delicacies to the people.

Here, a variety of Karnataka recipes are unveiled - Neerudose/Vade from Mangaluru, Jowar Rotti/ Hucchchellu Chatni from Bijapur, Gokak's Karadantu, Masala Dose from Mysore, Halasina Kadubu of Malenadu, Davanagere Benne Dose,  Mirchi/Mandakki of Ballary.  The spread of eatables challenges the taste buds of the eater, while introducing the rich culinary culture of the land. The food camps representing the six geographical areas - Hyderabad Karnataka, Coastal Karnataka, North Karnataka, Bayaluseeme, Malenadu, and Old Mysore, are always full of people. The preparation and distribution of vast range of food in large quantities, without compromising on quality and taste, is borne by Sri Vasudeva Adiga of 'Adigas' fame.

Bengaluru Ganesha Utsava is proud to preserve the heritage of nutritious food in Bengaluru, that too in the very presence of Bhakshapriya Ganesha. The youth of Bengaluru are enamored by the unique taste of the spread, quite unlike that of the burger and pizza.  After all, who wouldn't love a cultural feast along with culinary pleasure?

The festival is eco-friendly by being plastic-free.

Rangarang, Rangoli Utsava 

The heritage of 'Rangoli' has been lighting up our doorsteps - be it the poor or the rich, the palace or pooja place. Unfortunately, the art of 'Rangoli' that enlivens the excitement of celebratory functions is on the wane. Bengaluru Ganesha Utsava takes great pride in preserving and sustaining this hereditary art. For this purpose, 'Rangarang' program was arranged during the 48th and 50th years of the Utsava. The program was successful in bringing forth the talent of hundreds of women, putting the art form back in limelight. For the first time, several main roads of Bengaluru were closed to make way for the competition, demonstrating people's interest in the art form.

The program in the 48th year was arranged in two phases. The first phase on 8 September 2010, arranged in APS College grounds, had 556 contestants.  Around one hundred were selected for their effort in first round. On 19th Sep 2010, these 100 contestants participated in the second and final round arranged on DVG Road.  The winners of this round took home gold weighing 100, 50 and 25 grams. It was a treat to watch the mother earth, decorated with colorful, eye-catching designs of Rangoli. Thousands of spectators came to watch the colorful, diverse designs. The uniformed members of the Sangha maintained discipline during the program. The 48th year Rangoli competition was sponsored by Sri Sai Gold Palace.

Success of the 48th year Rangrang Rangoli Utsava encouraged the Sangha to arrange the same in its 50th year also. The first phase, arranged on 19 August 2012 on Malleshwaram 8th Cross, Margosa Road and Malleshwaram Play Ground, had 359 contestants. The second and final phase was arranged on Commercial Street.  Closing the crowded streets of Margosa Road, Malleshwaram 8th Cross and Commercial Street was a difficult task. On the streets which transacted huge business every day, holding the Rangoli competition was made possible, thanks to the cooperation of the shop-owners on these streets. Both sides of the streets were jam packed with people watching the exciting spectacle of Rangoli drawing. The winners got gold weighing 100, 50 and 25 grams, sponsored by Kandala Jewellers.

S M Nandish and his team brought in professionalism and brand equity to the Utsava. Team mobilized youths, acknowledged elders advice, reciprocated to contemporary issues and concerns. “These things lead us to success” says S M Nandish. With its ever growing popularity, increase in audience numbers, venue of the Utsava was shifted again in 2007 to A P S college grounds.

Golden Jubilee Celebrations 
Year 2012 was a milestone in Bengaluru Ganesha Utsava's history. The Sangha celebrated the 50th year, a rare occurrence in such events, with great pomp and show. The people of Bengaluru had an experience of a life time ('Na Bhooto Na Bhavishyati'), watching the golden jubilee being written in golden letters.

A definite plan and dedicated effort is needed to make any program successful. To ensure success of the golden jubilee celebration, several entertainment programs were planned. The 49th year celebration had the Bollywood stars Karina Kapoor, Govinda, Sushant Singh Rajput, Ankita Lokhande, singer Shaan, and our own Ramesh Aravind. To take the news of the festival to entire Bengaluru, advertisements were shown in PVR theatres. Large billboards, measuring 50–60 feet, containing all program details, were put up on Meenakshi Mall, Phoenix Mall, Lalbagh West Gate, DVG Road and Commercial Street. The golden jubilee celebration started with 'Rangarang' Rangoli competition. In the same year, the act of 500 Indian classical dancers performing simultaneously was recorded in 'Limca Book of Records'.

Giant Laddu 
Nobody will forget the 6000 kg Laddu, prepared with 1500 kg chickpeas, 1700 kg Ghee, 500 kg dry grapes, 2400 kg sugar, and labor of more than 100 people. Thousands lined up for a glimpse of this Giant Laddu, which, at the end of the festival, was distributed as Prasada to the devotees.

https://www.thehindu.com/todays-paper/tp-national/tp-karnataka/bangalores-biggest-ganesh-utsav-is-back/article6282031.ece

Deepotsava 
Before Ganesha Aarati every evening, more than 10,000 oil lamps were lit in the Pandal, APS college ground and the streets around Mallikarjuna Temple.  Thousands glittering lamps was a spectacular sight to behold.

Sand Ganesha 
An idol of 30 feet tall Sand Ganesha, along with Shiva and Parvati, was built beside Mallikarjuna temple of Basavanagudi, by artisans from Orissa. Thousands came to have a darshan on all days of the festival.

Many prestigious singers, dancers and artists performed during 2012 Ganesha Utsava. The Golden Jubilee celebrations were inaugurated by Dr. K.J. Yesudas, the renowned classical and devotional singer, by lighting a lamp. The doyen of music, Sri Ilaya Raaja performed to a full National College ground. Similar performances were from famous playback singers of Bollywood, Sri Sonu Nigam and Sri Shankar Mahadevan. Famous music composer, Sri Harikrishna, entertained the crowd with Kannada Film songs. Known famously as 'DSP', Sri Devi Sri Prasad sang Kannada, Telugu, Tamil and Hindi film songs. One of Bengaluru's favourite singers, Smt M.D.Pallavi, sang devotional songs and popular film songs. The duo of Kathak dancers of Bengaluru origin, Smt Nirupama and founder of Abhinava School of Dance, Sri Rajendra, presented a fantasy musical in Disney style 'Rama Katha Vismaya'. Sri Shivamani gave a rousing performance on the drums. In a program titled 'An evening of fusion and film songs', Kannada playback singer, 'Kannadigara Kanmani', Sri Vijaya Prakash presented a medley of 50 Kannada songs, gaining lot of praise from the appreciative crowd.

Achievements, Awards and World Records

Limca Book of Records 
The dance program on 19th Sep 2012 on DVG road was an awe-inspiring event during the 50th year of the Utsava. Enthusiastic dancers in colorful dresses, surprised spectators looking on, and members of the Sangha overseeing the program for its smooth conduct - all contributed to the lively atmosphere. More than 500 Indian classical dancers performed Bharatanatyam, Kathak, Odissi, Yakshagana, Mohiniattam, Kalaripayattu and Kuchupudi.

The performance of seven different dance forms with 500 artistes dancing simultaneously is recorded in 'Limca Book of Records', which was a highlight of the year.

Guinness Book of Records 
57th Ganesha Utsava had a special campaign - workshop on making eco-friendly clay Ganesha. The aim of the program was environment protection by reducing the pollutants that go in to the making of Ganesha idol. The workshop facilitated the eco-friendly Ganesha made by hand being taken home by the maker for worship. The seeds of Tulasi, flowers and fruits, kept inside the idol while making clay Ganesha, grow into plants after Visarjane. Ganesha, Lord of Earth, is made out of mud and is returned to mud, without any environmental impact. Around 2800 people of all ages participated in the program arranged on 25th Aug 2019 on National College Ground, Basavanagudi. The clay and other implements needed for making Ganesha was provided by the Sangha.  The program was a grand success, registering the Sangha's name in Guinness Book as 'the most people sculpting with clay simultaneously'. This has encouraged the Sangha to arrange the ecofriendly clay Ganesha making campaign on a very large scale during its 60th year.

Zee TV Award 
The 51st year Ganesha Utsava by the Sangha was awarded 'The Best Ganesha Utsava of Karnataka” by Zee TV Channel.

ISO Certification 
Another feather in Sangha's crown, achieved during the 55th year, has been the ISO 9001:2015 certification, given for the professional discipline and quality.

BGU Goes Global 
During the 54th year, the Sangha brought the prestigious Berklee College of Music, USA, for the first time to India. 42 students of the school from 22 countries performed during the celebration, which is considered a record.

Maharaja of Mysore in BGU 
For decades, the Sangha is considered a backbone of artists. During the 55th Utsava, 50 senior exponents of Karnatak music were honored by the Sangha, for their achievements in their respective fields. The Maharaja of Mysore Samsthana, Sri Yaduveera Krishnadutta Chamaraja Wodeyar, participated in the function and himself honored the artists, which was a special gesture.

Gold-Plated Silver Ornaments for Ganesha and Silver Ganesha 
In the 56th year, devotees of Ganesha, owners of 'Rajahans Printers', Sri Balachander and family, presented Ganesha with gold-plated silver crown , hand and foot, in all weighing 20 kg. These ornaments were put on Ganesha by the CEO and Administrator of Sringeri Mutt, Padma Sri awardee, Guru Seva Dhurina, Dr. V.R. Gowrishankar, which brought special sparkle to the occasion. In the same year, appreciating the Sangha's activities, a resident of Jayanagar, Sri Subhash Chandra presented to the Sangha a silver Ganesha, 2 feet tall weighing 6.5 kg.

Special Mantapa for Ganesha Utsava 
Over the last decade, the Sangha has placed emphasis on the mantapa also. These mantapas over the year, measuring more than 5000 sq ft in area, have been put up in APS College grounds and National College grounds. These mantapas recreate various scenic spots of Karnataka, viz., Beluru Halebeedu, Kolluru Mukambika, Melukote Chaluvarayaswamy temple kalyani, Darbar hall of Mysore Palace, Forest scene, etc.  People come from all corners of the city, stand in queue for hours, to view the mantapa and obtain blessings of Ganesha.

Famous Film Personalities in BGU 
The following cine-stars have participated in Ganesha Utsava over the years and have enhanced the charisma of the Sangha.

Famous stars of Kannada movie of yesteryears as well as today, Hanumanthachar, KLN Swamy(Ravi), Shivaram, Dwarakish, BV Radha, Gangadhar, Nagarathnamma, Master Hirannaiah, Manjula, Shreenath, Vishnuvardhan, Bharati Vishnuvardhan, Ambarish, Ashok, Ramesh Aravind, Shivarajkumar, Shreenagara Kitti, Yash, Comedian Chikkanna, Radhika Pandit, and Tamil stars Rajanikanth, Kamalahasan and famous star Shobhana.

Hindi film stars Hemamalini, Isha Sharvani, Amruta Arora, Karina Kapoor, Govinda, Sushant Singh Rajput, Ankita Lokhande, Rishi Kapoor, Chunky Pandey, Anil Kapoor – all of them have participated in various Ganesha Utsavas.

12 Hours of Non-Stop Musical Concerts 
Every year, the sangha presents innovative cultural programs, which gain acceptance with people. In its 56th year, the Sangha presented '12 hours of non-stop musical concert'. In the first year, Sri Purandara Aradhana Mahotsava was presented. A 'Hindustani Classical and Devotional' music program, by doyens of music was presented during 57th year. A program of semi-classical music, titled 'Haadu Haleyadadarenu Bhava Navanaveena' under Pravin D Rao's leadership was slated in the 58th year. Also presented the same year was a program featuring various music forms of India, by renowned playback singer Sangita Katti Kulkarni, titled 'Parampara – evolution of music in India'. In the 59th year, a musical homage to Lata Mangeshkar and Asha Bhosle included more than 70 musicians. The program was led by Flutist, Ashwini Kaushik, Manjunath N S of Manju Drum Collectives, Dr Suchetan Rangaswamy and Guitar Srinivas and collaborated by Praveen D Rao.

Since the onset of Corona pandemic, artists dependent solely on their art for their livelihood have been put to hardships. The Sangha is aware of this problem and embarked on a program to identify and encourage local artists all over Karnataka. This program '12 Ghantegala Gana Sangama' was under Guitar Srinivas Achar's leadership and the Sangha earmarked one complete day's program, out of 11 days cultural festival, for the artists identified. Various artists from Mangaluru, T Narasipura, Mandya – artists from various parts of Karnataka – participated. The Sangha lived up to its reputation by standing by the artists at difficult times.

Ecofriendly B.G.U 
Along with the festival, the Sangha has got itself involved in various social activities. Since the 48th year, the Utsava has been celebrated as 'Plastic-free'. Usage of plastic is not allowed anywhere inside the pandal. Shop participating in 'Ahara Utsava' cannot use plastic plate, tumbler, spoon or any other cutlery. As a model of ecofriendly behavior, the Sangha has done away with the use of POP Ganesha. Since 54th year, the Sangha is reusing the 8 feet tall main idol and has adopted clay Ganesha for worship. In addition, the Sangha has planned several programs to create awareness amongst people, the workshop for making ecofriendly clay Ganesha during the 57th year being the prime event.

Free Distribution of Go-Green Gowri-Ganesha 
In the 57th year, the Sangha distributed ecofriendly clay idols to hundreds of devotees free of cost. The program was arranged on 27 and 30 August 2019 at National College grounds.

Ganesha Visarjane 

People from various corners of Bengaluru participate in Ganesha Visarjane procession. A specially decorated chariot of Ganesha leads the procession. This chariot is followed by several types of dancers, special musical instruments, rural games of Daandi, Kolata, Kilu Kudure, Chande, Viragase, Bhadrakali, Kamsale, Nandikolu, Patada Kunita, Dollu Kunita, - all of which depict our rich culture. Accompanied by strains of Clarinet and pearl Pallakki containing Ganesha, the procession proceeding across main streets, decorated with sparkling bright lights, is a treat to watch. Devotees erupt with joy in the presence of their favourite god, Ganesha. Around 25,000 laddus are distributed amongst devotees during the procession. To prevent water pollution, the Sangha has stopped the Visarjane in Yediyur Lake, where Visarjane used to take place before. Instead, clean fresh water is brought in large Tipper, and the water after Visarjane is used in agricultural fields at a later date. 54th year onwards, ecofriendly clay Ganesha was being disbanded in a small water tank in a devotee's house in NR Colony and the water later used for watering the plants.. Since the processions were prohibited due to Covid during 58th and 59th year, Ganesha Visarjane was to be done inside Mallikarjuna temple compound. A small pond was dug in Mallikarjuna Temple compound and Visarjane was made to this small pond. This Visarjane procession, though a short trip from the Pandal to the Pond, is no less a spectacle.

Lockdown, Covid and BGU 
Lockdown In 2020, Covid had spread its dark shadow over the world. Previously unheard of lockdowns barred people from coming out of their houses. Artists were not spared too. It was a time when everyone felt mentally suppressed. With the aim of reducing the sense of fear amongst people and provide entertainment, the Sangha came up with the technology-driven idea of 'Facebook and Youtube' Live programs. This was a major achievement of the Sangha, known for its social awareness.

People needed entertainment during lockdown. Artists needed a stage to perform. The result was the 'Live' programs. This was a unique, previously unheard of, experience. Due to lockdown, the artists performed within the confines of their house and the Sangha took it to the people through Facebook and YouTube.

During the first lockdown from 5 April to 17 May 2020, the programs were conducted every day for 43 days and included performances of over 60 artists. An estimated 28 lakh people world over enjoyed the programs. The Sangha took pride in providing the artists with an opportunity to perform.

58th Ganesha Utsava trumps Covid 
Covid had the world in its grip in 2020. After an unbroken period of 57 years of festivities, the Utsava was on the verge of being stopped. This was a period of testing for the Sangha. When Ganesha festivals all over India were abandoned one-by-one, conduct of the Bengaluru Ganesha Utsava, by the grace of Ganesha, was a hair-raising experience.

Obtaining government approval was difficult. Artists were hesitant to perform. Door to door collection was a challenge. Faced with opposition from families of the members of the Sangha and the government directive not to assemble people, the Sangha conducted programs in Dayananda Sagar College Auditorium, with no spectators. The programs were beamed live via Facebook and YouTube and watched by lakhs of people worldwide. This attempt created a new record. In all, around 450 artists participated. Similarly, Poojas were performed with splendor, as usual. Adequate precautions as demanded by the conditions were taken.

The situation was no different during the 59th year. Based on the experience of the previous year, several precautionary measures were adopted. However, no compromise was made with the conduct of the Utsava. Around 400 artists participated in the cultural programs. All poojas were conducted with usual fervor. To add to it, Pallakki Utsava was introduced for the first time.

Bengaluru Ganesha Utsava in the 60th year

     The Sangha is preparing for its 60th year of celebration, having celebrated each previous year distinct from the other. The Vajra Mahotsava, conducted from August 13 to September 10, 2022, is expected to be a 'Manoranjaneya Mrushtanna' (a feast of entertainment). It will feature Natakotsava (a festival of drama), Sahasra Narikela Gana Homa (homa of one thousand coconuts for the welfare of the world), Sangeetotsava in the famous malls of Bengaluru, workshop on making ecofriendly Ganesh of clay expected to be attended by thousands, special poojas, different entertainment programs, Pallakki Utsava accompanied with Veda Ghosha and Nagara Sankirtana, devotional recitation every day by famous Bhajana Mandalis, and much more. Please come and participate in your favourite festival and obtain Ganesha's blessings.

Stage 
Every year, the mantapa(stage) for the festival is made to resemble architectural marvels in Karnataka. In 2014, 2015 and 2016, replicas of Melkote temple Kalyani, Kollur Mookambika temple and Dharmastala Manjunatha temple have been recreated at the grounds. 2017 hosted the 55th festival which showcased a replica of the Durbar Hall of Mysore Palace

References

External links 
 www.bgu.co.in/

Culture of Bangalore
Festivals in Karnataka